"(Si Si) Je Suis un Rock Star" is a song by Bill Wyman of the Rolling Stones, released in 1981 as the lead single from his eponymous third solo studio album, through A&M Records.

While most of the song is in English, the chorus is in Franglais: "Je suis un rock star / Je avais un residence / Je habiter là / à la south of France / Voulez-vous / partir with me? / And come and rester là / with me in France."

Wyman originally wrote the song for Ian Dury. However, finding himself unable to interest Dury or any other artist in it, he reluctantly recorded the song himself, using an accent he later described as "Cockney French".

The song's highest chart position in the UK was at number 14, and it spent nine weeks in total in the top 40.

Track list
All songs written by Bill Wyman.
A-side
1. "(Si Si) Je Suis un Rock Star" – 3:22

B-side
2. "Rio De Janeiro" – 3:50

Personnel
Bill Wyman – lead vocals, bass guitar, all other instruments, design
Terry Taylor – guitar, backing vocals
Bruce Rowland – drums on "(Si Si) Je Suis un Rock Star"
Jim Phantom – drums on "Rio De Janeiro"
Stuart Epps – engineer
Mike Ross – design
Graham Hughes – photography

Charts

Weekly charts

Year-end charts

References

1980 songs
1981 singles
Bill Wyman songs
A&M Records singles
British new wave songs
Song recordings produced by Chris Kimsey
Songs about London
Songs written by Bill Wyman
Franglais songs